"Golliwog" (also known as "Gulleplutt", English: "Sweetheart") is the debut English-language single by Swedish singer Agnetha Fältskog.

Background
Golliwog was the first attempt by Fältskog to enter the charts outside Sweden; the eight German-language music singles she released, in her early solo career, also did not enter the charts. With "Golliwog", the intention was that, not only Germany, but all of Europe would get to know her as a solo artist in her own right. The "Golliwog" single was not successful in either Sweden or Europe, despite that she was already known as a member of ABBA.

The B-side of Golliwog was also recorded in English as Here For Your Love ("Tio Mil Kvar Till Korpilombolo"), at the marketing suggestion of Fältskog's record company, Cupol. During Fältskog's time with ABBA, she had been against releasing English versions of her songs, while lyricist Bosse Carlgren was not too keen on his English lyrics; he had reportedly thought of the word as a "ragdoll" when he looked up the dictionary.

As Gulleplutt, the song was released as the B-side to Fältskog's Swedish-language single, "Dom har glömt"  ("They've Forgotten"), a year later.

Notes

External links
Discogs master page

1974 singles
Agnetha Fältskog songs
Songs written by Agnetha Fältskog
Songs written by Bosse Carlgren
1974 songs
CBS Records singles